Verimli is a small village in Tarsus district of Mersin Province, Turkey. It is situated in Çukurova (Cilicia of antiquity). It is one of the easternmost villages of Mersin Province. When completed, Çukurova Airport will be to the west of the village. The population of village is only 97 as of 2012.

References

Villages in Tarsus District